Elaine Usher (8 June 1932 – 1 January 2014) was an English actress. She was known for her work on British television.

Personal life
Usher married actor Peter Sallis at St. John's Wood Church in London on 9 February 1957. However, it was a turbulent relationship, Usher left Sallis sixteen times until they eventually divorced in 1965. However, they eventually reconciled and continued to live together until 1999; Usher remained close to Sallis until her death in 2014. They had one son, Crispian Sallis (born 1959), who works as a film set designer.

Death
Usher died on 1 January 2014 in Richmond, London, England, at the age of 81.

Television and filmography

Television

References

External links
 

1932 births
2014 deaths
20th-century English actresses
English television actresses
Actors from Bournemouth